Tommi Miettinen (born December 3, 1975) is a retired Finnish professional ice hockey player and current head coach for KalPa, the Finnish club he played for until he ended his playing career in 2013.

Miettinen was drafted 236th overall by the Mighty Ducks of Anaheim in the 1994 NHL Entry Draft. He is the older brother of Tatu Miettinen.

Career statistics

References

External links 

1975 births
Finnish ice hockey centres
Anaheim Ducks draft picks
KalPa players
HC TPS players
Ilves players
Brynäs IF players
SC Langnau players
Luleå HF players
Living people
People from Kuopio
Sportspeople from North Savo